Klaus Allisat (born 8 May 1938) is a German fencer. He represented the United Team of Germany at the 1964 Summer Olympics and West Germany at the 1968 Summer Olympics in the team sabre events.

References

1938 births
Living people
German male fencers
Olympic fencers of the United Team of Germany
Olympic fencers of West Germany
Fencers at the 1964 Summer Olympics
Fencers at the 1968 Summer Olympics
Fencers from Berlin
German sabre fencers
20th-century German people